Input/output (I/O) scheduling is the method that computer operating systems use to decide in which order I/O operations will be submitted to storage volumes. I/O scheduling is sometimes called disk scheduling.

Purpose
I/O scheduling usually has to work with hard disk drives that have long access times for requests placed far away from the current position of the disk head (this operation is called a seek). To minimize the effect this has on system performance, most I/O schedulers implement a variant of the  elevator algorithm that reorders the incoming randomly ordered requests so the associated data would be accessed with minimal arm/head movement.

I/O schedulers can have many purposes depending on the goals; common purposes include the following
 To minimize time wasted by hard disk seeks
 To prioritize a certain processes' I/O requests
 To give a share of the disk bandwidth to each running process
 To guarantee that certain requests will be issued before a particular deadline

Disciplines
Common scheduling disciplines include the following:
Random scheduling (RSS)
 First In, First Out (FIFO), also known as First Come First Served (FCFS)
 Last In, First Out (LIFO)
 Shortest seek first, also known as Shortest Seek / Service Time First (SSTF)
 Elevator algorithm, also known as SCAN (including its variants, C-SCAN, LOOK, and C-LOOK)
 N-Step-SCAN SCAN of N records at a time
 FSCAN, N-Step-SCAN where N equals queue size at start of the SCAN cycle
 Completely Fair Queuing (CFQ) on Linux
 Anticipatory scheduling
 Noop scheduler
 Deadline scheduler
 mClock scheduler
 Budget Fair Queueing (BFQ) scheduler.
 Kyber
NONE (used for NVM Express drives)
mq-deadline (used for SSD SATA drives)
cfq bfq and bfq-mq (used for HDD drives)

See also 
 Tagged Command Queuing (TCQ)
 Native Command Queuing (NCQ)

References

Further reading
Linux I/O schedulers, from Ubuntu Wiki
Operating Systems: Three Easy Pieces, by Remzi H. Arpaci-Dusseau and Andrea C. Arpaci-Dusseau. Arpaci-Dusseau Books, 2014. Relevant chapter: Hard Disk Drives
Love, R. (2005). Linux Kernel Development, Novell Press. 
Operating Systems: Internals and Design Principles, seventh edition, by William Stallings.

External links